Gułdowy is a district of Cieszyn, Silesian Voivodeship, Poland. It was a separate municipality, but became administratively a part of Cieszyn in 1973.

The village was first mentioned in 1461. It belonged then to the Duchy of Cieszyn, formed in 1290.

People born in Gułdowy 
Jan Szuścik (1879-1941), Polish teacher, politician, member of the Silesian Parliament
Józef Czudek (1883-1941), Polish teacher, Jesuit

Footnotes 

Neighbourhoods in Silesian Voivodeship
Cieszyn